Giuseppe Ficco (born 26 August 1974) is an Italian weightlifter. He competed in the men's lightweight event at the 2000 Summer Olympics.

References

1974 births
Living people
Italian male weightlifters
Olympic weightlifters of Italy
Weightlifters at the 2000 Summer Olympics
Sportspeople from Bari